Narita Brian (May 3, 1991 – September 27, 1998) was a Japanese racehorse. Until T M Opera O surpassed him in 2000, Narita Brian was the world's top money earner.

Background
Narita Brian was a bay horse sired by the American-bred stallion Brian's Time, out of the mare Pacificus, a daughter of Northern Dancer. He was a brother of Biwa Hayahide, the Champion horse in Japan in 1993.

Racing career
Racing as a two-year-old in 1993, Narita Brian won the Asahi Hai Sansai Stakes at Nakayama Racecourse. In the following year he completed the Japanese Triple Crown of Thoroughbred Racing by winning the Satsuki Shō, Tokyo Yūshun and Kikuka Shō before defeating older horses in the Arima Kinen.

He stayed in training for a further two years winning the Hanshin Daishōten in 1995 and 1996. In the latter year he defeated the 1995 Japanese Horse of the Year Mayano Top Gun.

Awards and honours
Narita Brian was voted JRA Award Best Two-year-old Colt in 1993. In 1994 he was voted Best Three-year-old Colt and Japanese Horse of the Year in 1994. He was declared "Horse of the 20th century" in Japan. In 1998 he was elected to the JRA Hall of Fame.

A museum dedicated to Narita Brian named the was opened on his death anniversary in 2000, but was closed in 2008. The structure is now the Yushun Memorial Hall, with the exhibits' focus being more oriented around those of Oguri Cap.

Stud career
Narita Brian's most successful offspring was Daitaku Flag who was 4th in the Japanese 2000 Guineas. He died in 1998 because of a gastric rupture.

Pedigree

See also
List of leading Thoroughbred racehorses
List of historical horses

References

1991 racehorse births
1998 racehorse deaths
Racehorses bred in Japan
Racehorses trained in Japan
Triple Crown of Thoroughbred Racing winners
Japanese Thoroughbred Horse of the Year
Thoroughbred family 13-a